San Joaquín is a small agricultural town in the Beni Department in the Bolivian lowlands.

It is served by San Joaquín Airport.

History 
The Jesuit mission of San Joaquín was founded in 1709. Baure Indians resided at the mission.

Languages
Camba Spanish is the primary vernacular lingua franca spoken in the town. The Joaquiniano dialect of Baure is also spoken in San Joaquín.

Location 
San Joaquín is the administrative capital of Mamoré Province and is at an elevation of 142 m above sea level. It is just west of the Machupo River, a tributary of the Iténez River.

Geography 
San Joaquín is located in the Moxos Plains (Llanos de Moxos), at 100,000 km² one of the greatest wetlands of the Earth. Main vegetation in the area of San Joaquín is the tropical savanna.

Climate 
The yearly precipitation of the region is 1,800 mm, with a distinct dry season from May to September. Monthly average temperatures vary from 24 °C und 29 °C over the year.

Population
Over the past two decades, the town's population has risen by circa 30%, from 3,489 (census 1992) to 4,094 (census 2001) and 4,589 (2009 estimate). San Joaquin has been the site of a Machupo virus or Bolivian Hemorragic Fever outbreak in the 1960s.

Notable people
 Jeanine Áñez, politician

References

External links
Detailed map of Mamoré Province
San Joaquín climate (German)

Populated places in Beni Department
Jesuit Missions of Moxos